Warm Blanket is the third studio album by American singer-songwriter Dent May. It was released in August 2013 under Paw Tracks.

Accolades

Track listing

References

2013 albums
Dent May albums